Miguel Martinez (born 17 January 1976 in Fourchambault, Nièvre) is a French road cyclist and cross-country mountain biker, who most recently rode for UCI Continental team . He won the gold medal at the 2000 Summer Olympics in Sydney, Australia after having finished in third place in the inaugural event at the 1996 Summer Olympics. He also rode in the 2002 Tour de France, finishing 44th. His brother Yannick, father Mariano and uncle Martin were also professional cyclists. He is also the father of racing cyclist Lenny Martinez.

Major results

Mountain bike

1994
 1st  Cross-country, UEC European Junior Championships
1995
 2nd  Cross-country, UCI World Championships
1996
 1st  Cross-country, National Championships
 2nd Overall UCI XC World Cup
1st Helen
1st Bromont
1st Kristiansand
 2nd  Cross-country, UCI World Under-23 Championships
 3rd  Cross-country, Olympic Games
1997
 1st  Cross-country, UCI World Under-23 Championships
 1st  Overall UCI XC World Cup
1st Spindleruv Mlyn
1st Mont Sainte-Anne
1st Houffalize
 1st  Cross-country, UEC European Under-23 Championships
 1st Roc d'Azur
 2nd Cross-country, National Championships
1998
 1st  Cross-country, UCI World Under-23 Championships
 2nd Overall UCI XC World Cup
 2nd Roc d'Azur
1999
 1st  Cross-country, UEC European Championships
 2nd  Cross-country, UCI World Championships
 2nd Overall UCI XC World Cup
1st Napa Valley
 2nd Cross-country, National Championships
 2nd Roc d'Azur
2000
 1st  Cross-country, Summer Olympics
 1st  Cross-country, UCI World Championships 
 1st  Overall UCI XC World Cup
1st Sarntal-Sarentino
2001
 2nd Overall UCI XC World Cup
1st Sarntal-Sarentino
1st Leysin
2003
 2nd Cross-country, National Championships
 2nd Roc d'Azur
2004
 1st Roc d'Azur
2008
 1st Sea Otter Classic
2013
 1st Roc d'Azur
 1st Sea Otter Classic
 2nd Cross-country, National Championships
2017
 1st  Marathon, National Championships

Cyclo-cross

1993
 1st  National Junior Championships
 3rd  UCI World Junior Championships
1994
 1st  National Junior Championships
1996
 1st  UCI World Under-23 Championships
 1st  National Under-23 Championships
1998
 1st  National Under-23 Championships
 1st Overall Challenge la France de cyclo-cross
2000
 3rd National Championships
2001
 3rd National Championships

Road

2002
 1st Stage 3 Vuelta a Navarra
2008
 1st Stage 3 Tour de Beauce

References

External links
 
 
 
 

1976 births
Living people
Sportspeople from Nièvre
French male cyclists
Cross-country mountain bikers
Cyclists at the 1996 Summer Olympics
Cyclists at the 2000 Summer Olympics
Cyclists at the 2004 Summer Olympics
Olympic cyclists of France
Olympic bronze medalists for France
Olympic gold medalists for France
Olympic medalists in cycling
UCI Mountain Bike World Champions (men)
Medalists at the 2000 Summer Olympics
Medalists at the 1996 Summer Olympics
French people of Spanish descent
Cyclo-cross cyclists
Cyclists from Bourgogne-Franche-Comté
20th-century French people
21st-century French people